The Alliance for Nuclear Accountability (ANA) is a network of local, regional and national organizations working collaboratively on issues of nuclear weapons production and waste cleanup. Many of the local groups live downwind and downstream of the United States nuclear weapons complex sites. The member organizations are watchdogs of the Department of Energy nuclear weapons and energy programs. It was founded in 1987, under the name Military Production Network.

Member organizations

References

External links
 ANA Website

Anti–nuclear weapons movement
Government watchdog groups in the United States
1987 establishments in the United States